Werner Zirngibl (born 4 September 1956) is a former professional tennis player from Germany.

Biography
A right-handed player, Zirngibl won his first Grand Slam match at the January edition of the 1977 Australian Open, then had to retire during his second round match against Dick Crealy.

He managed to win the Belgium International Tennis Championships in 1978 as a qualifier. Following an upset win against top seed Adriano Panatta in the semi-finals, he had a four-set win over Ricardo Cano in the final. The tournament, held on outdoor clay courts in Brussels, was part of the Grand Prix tennis circuit. This was the first occasion a qualifier had gone on to win a Grand Prix tournament.

In 1979 he represented West Germany in a Davis Cup tie at home in Augsburg against Israel. His only appearance was in the doubles with Ulrich Pinner, which they won over the Israeli pairing of Shlomo Glickstein and Meir Wertheimer.

At the 1979 French Open he equalled his best performance at a Grand Slam when he made it to the second round.

Zirngibl studied medicine during his tennis career and became an orthopaedic surgeon. Based in Munich, he has performed surgery on top players including Michael Stich and Ivan Lendl.

Grand Prix career finals

Singles: 1 (1–0)

Challenger titles

Singles: (2)

See also
List of Germany Davis Cup team representatives

References

External links
 
 
 

1956 births
Living people
German male tennis players
West German male tennis players
German orthopedic surgeons
Sportspeople from Bonn
Tennis people from North Rhine-Westphalia